Everything is Possible: The Best of Os Mutantes is a best of compilation by the Brazilian tropicalia band Os Mutantes. Compiled by David Byrne of Talking Heads, it was released by his world music record label Luaka Bop in 1999. Aimed towards an English-speaking market, its track selection differs much from other Mutantes compilations. It includes an abridged version of "Ando Meio Desligado."

Track listing

References

Os Mutantes albums
1999 greatest hits albums
Luaka Bop compilation albums